Gowd-e Bid (also Romanized as Gowd-e Bīd) is a village in Dehshir Rural District, in the Central District of Taft County, Yazd Province, Iran. At the 2006 census, its population was 29, in 4 families.

References 

Populated places in Taft County